Elite overproduction is a concept developed by Peter Turchin, which describes the condition of a society which is producing too many potential elite-members relative to its ability to absorb them into the power structure. This, he hypothesizes, is a cause for social instability, as those left out of power feel aggrieved by their relatively low socioeconomic status.

However, Turchin's model cannot foretell precisely how a crisis will unfold; it can only yield probabilities. Turchin likened this to the accumulation of deadwood in a forest over many years, paving the way for a cataclysmic forest fire later on. It is possible to predict a massive conflagration, Turchin argues, but not what causes it.

Overview 
According to Turchin and Jack Goldstone, periods of political instability have throughout human history been due to the purely self-interested behavior of the elite. When the economy faced a surge in the workforce, which exerted a downward pressure on wages, the elite generally kept much of the wealth generated to themselves, resisting taxation and income redistribution. In the face of intensifying competition, they also sought to restrict the window of opportunity, to preserve their power and status for their descendants. These actions exacerbated inequality, a key driver of sociopolitical turbulence due to the proneness of the relatively well-off to radicalism. Widespread progressive political beliefs among university graduates, for instance, can be due to widespread underemployment rather than from exposure to progressive ideas or experiences during their studies. Turchin has said that elite overproduction explains social disturbances during the late Roman empire and the French Wars of Religion, and predicted in 2010 that this situation would cause social unrest in the United States of America during the 2020s.

United Kingdom 
In the United Kingdom, there were simply not enough working-class Britons disenchanted with the status quo to support the Brexit movement, which was also buoyed by many highly educated voters, many of whom indebted and under- or unemployed, as there were not enough jobs to match their degrees. As the educated class moves further to the left, left-wing ideals grow in popularity.

United States 
In the case of the United States, by the 2010s, it became clear that the cost of higher education has ballooned over the previous three to four decades—faster than inflation, in fact—thanks to growing demand. For this prediction, Turchin used current data and the structural-demographic theory, a mathematical model of how population changes affect the behavior of the state, the elite, and the commons, created by Jack Goldstone. Goldstone himself predicted using his model that in the twenty-first century, the United States would elect a national populist leader. Elite overproduction has been cited as a root cause of political tension in the U.S., as so many well-educated Millennials are either unemployed, underemployed, or otherwise not achieving the high status they expect. Even then, the nation continued to produce excess lawyers and PhD holders, especially in the humanities and social sciences, for which employment prospects were dim, before the COVID-19 pandemic hit. Moreover, according to projections by the U.S. Census Bureau, the share of people in their 20s continued to grow till the end of the 2010s, meaning the youth bulge would likely not fade away before the 2020s. As such the gap between the supply and demand in the labor market would likely not fall before then, and falling or stagnant wages generate sociopolitical stress.

See also 

 Higher-education bubble in the United States
 Power struggle
 Credentialism
 Toynbee's theory of social decay

References 

Political science terminology
Power (social and political) concepts